The green racket-tail (Prioniturus luconensis) is an endemic parrot of the Philippines where it is found on Luzon and Marinduque. This species was once common, but is rapidly declining and is currently classified as endangered due to lowland deforestation and capture for cage-bird trade.  The population is now estimated to be just 1,000 - 2,499 mature individuals and is continuing to decline with many local extinctions in its former range.

Description 
Ebird describes this bird as "A rare medium-sized parrot of lowland and foothill forest on Luzon. The two central tail feathers have extended shafts ending in a racket shape. Overall green in color, slightly darker on the back, with paler head and underparts and a pale bill. Male is more yellowish-green in color. Overlaps geographically with the Luzon racket-tail, but Green is found at lower elevations and lacks the brownish back. Also overlaps with Blue-naped parrot, but has a pale rather than red bill. Voice consists of ringing metallic squawks.
They are sexually dimorphic. Males are entirely yellow-green, with paler underparts and head. The two central tail feathers are elongated with bare shafts and terminated with black rackets. Females are generally darker and less yellowish, while the bare tail shafts are shorter. Juveniles do not have rackets at the tail. Total length is about 29 centimeters.

Like all other Racket-tails, they are cavity nesters.

Habitat and Conservation Status 
Green racket-tails can be found in the canopy of tropical  lowland rainforests in elevations of up to 700 meters where it mainly prefers primary forest but is also seen in secondary forest and forest. They have also been recorded visiting cultivations to feed on crops.

It is listed as Endangered with the population being estimated at 1,000 - 2,499 individuals remaining. It has gone locally extinct in many of its former sites and is feared extinct on Marinduque. Its main threat is trapping for the cage-bird trade. Local extinctions as a direct result of forest loss are very likely. In 1988, forest cover was just 3% on Marinduque and 24% on Luzon with the remaining forest continuing to be threatened by both legal and illegal logging. mining, road construction, slash-and-burn or kaingin.

In its stronghold in Subic has experienced increased illegal logging and deforestation continues in Maria Aurora Memorial Natural Park. Interspecific competition is also a threat as they have been replaced by the commoner Blue-crowned racket-tail in Quezon National Forest Park.

It is currently known from two protected areas Bataan National Park and the Northern Sierra Madre Natural Park. It receives nominal protection in the Maria Aurora Memorial Natural Park. However, like most areas in the Philippines protection and enforcement is lax and deforestation and the cage-bird trade continue.

Conservation actions proposed  include surveys to identify further sites supporting key populations, with a view to formally establishing them as protected areas. Research its ecology and year-round requirements, to improve understanding of its management needs. Examine trends in Racket-tail species at all sites to monitor the spread of the apparently invasive Blue-crowned racket-tail. Improve protection measures against logging at Subic Bay Forest Reserve. Clamp down on illegal logging within the species's range, and ensure that environmental impact assessments are carried out before any new logging concessions are granted. Establish a captive breeding population to support future reintroduction and supplementation efforts. Lobby against proposed developments that threaten suitable habitat.

References

External links
BirdLife Species Factsheet. 
Oriental Bird Images: Green racquet-tail   Selected photos

green racket-tail
Birds of Luzon
Fauna of Marinduque
Endemic birds of the Philippines
green racket-tail
green racket-tail